The Best Breakthrough Athlete ESPY Award, known alternatively as the Breakthrough Athlete of the Year ESPY Award, is an annual award honoring the achievements of an individual in the world of sports. It was first awarded as part of the ESPY Awards in 1993. The Best Breakthrough Athlete ESPY Award trophy, created by sculptor Lawrence Nowlan, is awarded to the sportsperson adjudged to have made the greatest breakthrough in a major international individual sport or North American professional team sport. The award is typically given to a sportsperson in his or her rookie season at a given level but may be won by any athlete who in a given year improves his or her performance dramatically or otherwise becomes well-recognized. Since 2004, the winner has been chosen by online voting through choices selected by the ESPN Select Nominating Committee. Before that, determination of the winners was made by an panel of experts. Through the 2001 iteration of the ESPY Awards, ceremonies were conducted in February of each year to honor achievements over the previous calendar year; awards presented thereafter are conferred in July and reflect performance from the June previous.

The inaugural winner of the Best Breakthrough Athlete ESPY Award in 1993 was San Diego Pardres outfielder Gary Sheffield. The Los Angeles Dodgers pitcher Hideo Nomo of Japan received the trophy in 1996, and is one of two sports persons born outside of the United States to have received the award, the other being Dominican Republican left fielder and second baseman Alfonso Soriano of the New York Yankees in 2003. Additionally, 2022 winner Eileen Gu was born in America, but competed for China. Gu is one of two women to win the award, the other being Mo'ne Davis of the Little League Baseball team Anderson Monarchs in 2015. American football players have been most successful at the awards with eleven victories and thirteen nominations, followed by baseball players with eight wins and ten nominations. No athlete has ever won the accolade more than once. The 2017 winner of the Best Breakthrough Athlete ESPY Award was quarterback Dak Prescott of the Dallas Cowboys who led the No. 1 National Football Conference seed to a 13–3 record. The award was not awarded in 2020 due to the COVID-19 pandemic.

Winners and nominees

See also

 Laureus World Sports Award for Breakthrough of the Year
 ATP Newcomer of the Year Award
 Calder Memorial Trophy (National Hockey League)
 MLB Rookie of the Year Award
 MLS Rookie of the Year Award
 NASCAR Rookie of the Year Award
 NBA Rookie of the Year Award
 NFL Rookie of the Year Award
 PGA Tour Rookie of the Year Award

Notes and references

Notes

References

External links
 

ESPY Awards